BNP Paribas Real Estate, formerly Atisreal, is a European commercial property consultancy company and subsidiary of BNP Paribas with around 2,600 employees in 51 cities.  Its headquarters were in Levallois-Perret, France. In June 2009 the Atisreal brand was dropped and the BNP Paribas Real Estate brand replaced it.

History
Atisreal was formed in 2003 when the Vendome Rome Group acquired three leading European surveying firms: Auguste-Thouard in France, Müller in Germany and Weatherall Green & Smith in the UK.
In 2006, Atisreal became a subsidiary of BNP Paribas Real Estate; a division of the leading French financial services group BNP Paribas.  In Summer 2009, the company changed its name to BNP Paribas Real Estate Advisory and Property Management Ltd

References

External links
Atisreal's Website
Algarve Properties
BNP Paribas Website
BNP Paribas Real Estate's Website

BNP Paribas
Real estate companies of France